The Chipmunks Go to the Movies is a 1969 music album by David Seville and Alvin and the Chipmunks, released by Sunset Records, the budget-line subsidiary of Liberty Records.

It was the final studio album by Alvin, Simon & Theodore with David Seville, having been released three years before the death of Ross Bagdasarian. There would be an 11-year gap until the next Chipmunk album Chipmunk Punk was released by Bagdasarian's son, Ross Bagdasarian Jr.

The Chipmunks Go to the Movies was released on cassette in 1987 and compact disc in 2008 by Capitol Records.

Track listing
All songs written by Richard M. Sherman and Robert B. Sherman except where noted.

Tracks 3 and 7 were originally released on The Chipmunks Sing with Children (1965)

Track 4 was originally released on Let's All Sing with The Chipmunks, Track 6 Chipmunks à Go-Go, Track 7 The Chipmunks Sing with Children, Track 8 The Chipmunks See Doctor Dolittle, and Track 9 The Chipmunks Sing the Beatles Hits.

References

1969 albums
Alvin and the Chipmunks albums
Liberty Records albums
Sunset Records albums
Capitol Records albums